Tatari may refer to:

 Tatari (curse), vengeance exacted by onryō in Japanese folklore
 Tatari (spider), a genus of spiders
 Tatari, Tallinn, a subdistrict in the capital city of Estonia
 Tatari, Iran, a village in Iran
 , a village in Belene Municipality, Bulgaria

People with the name 
 Miranda Tatari, Croatian handball player
 Tatari Ali, Nigerian politician
 Tatari Oguz Effendi, Ottoman intellectual

See also 
 Tatar (disambiguation)
 Tartary
 Tattare
 Tarati (disambiguation)
 Pop Tatari, a 1992 music album